Division No. 7 (Brandon Area) is a census division located within the Westman Region in the south western area of the province of Manitoba, Canada. Unlike in some other provinces, census divisions do not reflect the organization of local government in Manitoba. These areas exist solely for the purposes of statistical analysis and presentation; they have no government of their own.

The area's major service centre is the city of Brandon, the second largest city in the province. The area population in 2001 was 57,148. The major industries of the Brandon area are agriculture, fertilizer manufacturing, livestock production, and packaging. The Canadian Forces are a major employer due to their training base (CFB Shilo) near the community of Shilo.

Demographics 

Cities 

Brandon

Towns

Carberry

Unincorporated communities

Glenboro
Rivers
Souris
Wawanesa

Municipalities

Cornwallis
Elton
Glenboro – South Cypress
North Cypress – Langford (part in Division No. 15)
Oakland – Wawanesa
Riverdale
Souris – Glenwood
Whitehead

References

External links
Manitoba Regional Profiles: Westman Region

07